Scholtzia uberiflora is a shrub species in the family Myrtaceae that is endemic to Western Australia.

It has long arching branches that can cover heathland plants below. It blooms between May and October producing pink-white flowers.

The species was first formally described by the botanist Ferdinand von Mueller in 1864 as part of the work Fragmenta Phytographiae Australiae. The only known synonym is Baeckea uberiflora.

It is found on sandplains and river flats along the west coast in the Mid West region of Western Australia around Northampton  where it grows in sandy soils. It is associated with kwongan woodland communities.

References

uberiflora
Plants described in 1864
Taxa named by Ferdinand von Mueller